Irina Smirnova may refer to:

 Irina Smirnova (boxer), Belarusian boxer in 2002 Women's World Amateur Boxing Championships
 Irina Ilchenko, Soviet / Russian volleyball player born in 1968
Irina Smirnova (politician), Kazakhstan politician born in 1960
 Irina Smirnova (volleyball), Russian volleyball player born in 1990
 Irina Smirnova (tennis), female Russian tennis player (1984) in 2011 ITF Women's Circuit (July–September)